Artur Oscar Lopes (born 17 October 1950 in the city of Rio de Janeiro) is a Brazilian writer and mathematician working on dynamical systems and ergodic theory. He is a professor at UFRGS, Porto Alegre.

He earned his Ph.D. from the IMPA in 1977 under the supervision of Jacob Palis.

He is a recipient of Brazil's National Order of Scientific Merit in mathematics. Since 2007 he has been a member of the Brazilian Academy of Sciences.

Selected publications 
 with A. Freire and R. Mañé: 

 
 with G. Contreras and Ph. Thieullen:

References 

21st-century Brazilian mathematicians
1950 births
Living people
Textbook writers
Members of the Brazilian Academy of Sciences
Instituto Nacional de Matemática Pura e Aplicada alumni
Academic staff of the Federal University of Rio Grande do Sul
Dynamical systems theorists
People from Rio de Janeiro (city)
20th-century Brazilian mathematicians